Kad Merad (born Kaddour Merad, ; 27 March 1964) is a French-Algerian filmmaker and actor who has acted both on stage and on screen.

Life and career 

Kad Merad was born in Sidi Bel Abbès, Algeria, on 27 March 1964 to an Algerian father and a French mother.

During his teens, he played drums and sang with various rock bands. Soon afterwards, he started playing roles at Club Med alongside the Gigolo Brothers troupe.

In 1990, he was hired by Ouï FM, the Paris rock radio station where he met Olivier Baroux. The duet most known as Kad & Olivier began working together and started their own show, the Rock'n Roll Circus, introducing some of their most famous sketches (Pamela Rose, Teddy Porc Fidèle...). The early success of the show allowed them to meet Jean-Luc Delarue who brought their act to TV.

In 1999, they began appearing on the French Satellite TV channel Comédie+ on their own show, La Grosse Emission. At the same time, Merad started his Cinema career with a lot of secondary roles.

In 2003, he scored his First box-office success with Mais Qui a tué Pamela Rose?, co-written with Baroux.

In 2007, Kad received the César Award for Best Supporting Actor for his role in Je vais Bien, ne t'en fais pas! and appears in AaRON's film soundtrack video clip. His best challenger was Dany Boon. During the shooting of Bienvenue chez les Ch'tis, this friendly struggle was a running joke between the two of them.

That same year, he made his first appearance with Les Enfoirés music troop and is still one of its members. He was also inducted as the Godfather of the Telethon.

The next year, he starred as Phillipe Abrams in the French movie Bienvenue chez les Ch'tis. The film was a surprise - and phenomenal - success in France and Europe, becoming the best-attended movie ever made in France, with 21 million moviegoers.

Filmography

As actor

Director / Writer

Theater

References

External links

 

1964 births
Living people
Algerian emigrants to France
People from Sidi Bel Abbès
French male film actors
French male television actors
Algerian people of French descent
Algerian screenwriters
French male voice actors
20th-century French male actors
21st-century French male actors
French film directors
French male screenwriters
French screenwriters
Best Supporting Actor César Award winners